The Men's super-G competition at the 2015 World Championships was held on Thursday, February 5.

Results
The race was scheduled to start at 11:00 MST on February 4, but was postponed a day due to bad weather.

References

Men's super-G